The Masters Building is a historic building located in Mount Pleasant, Iowa, United States.  Completed in 1937, this two story, brick structure is an adaptation of the commercial Art Deco and Art Moderne styles.  The decorative elements are found in the brick patterning and cast concrete panels on the facade. 
There are three other buildings on this same block that were built about the same time and use the same decorative techniques, with the Masters Building being the best example.  This area was an expansion of the central business district after the construction of city hall across the street in 1936.  A plumbing business, for which this building was constructed, was located on the first floor.  There are three apartments on the second floor.  The building was listed on the National Register of Historic Places in 1991.

References

Commercial buildings completed in 1937
Buildings and structures in Mount Pleasant, Iowa
National Register of Historic Places in Henry County, Iowa
Commercial buildings on the National Register of Historic Places in Iowa
Moderne architecture in Iowa
1937 establishments in Iowa